Penholder may refer to:

 Penholder (grip), a table tennis grip
 "Penholder" (song), an alternative rock song
 The Penholder, a novel by Elin Wägner